The Symphony in C major by German composer Robert Schumann was published in 1847 as his Symphony No. 2, Op. 61, although it was the third symphony he had completed, counting the B-flat major symphony published as No. 1 in 1841, and the original version of his D minor symphony of 1841 (later revised and published as No. 4). It is dedicated to Oscar I, king of Sweden and Norway.

Background
Schumann began to sketch the symphony on December 12, 1845, and had a robust draft of the entire work by December 28. He spent most of the next year orchestrating, beginning February 12, 1846. His depression and poor health, including ringing in his ears, prevented him finishing the work until October 19. The uplifting tone of the symphony is thus remarkable considering Schumann's health problems during the time of its composition—the work can be seen as a Beethovenian triumph over fate/pessimism, as Beethoven himself described in the Heiligenstadt Testament.

The year of 1845 was important for Schumann because it signaled a shift in his compositional strategy. He began to compose away from the piano, as he noted in his writing:

Not until the year 1845, when I began to conceive and work out everything in my head, did an entirely different manner of composition begin to develop

The strategic shift above can be ascribed to his intensive study of counterpoint in the same year with his wife, Clara Schumann. Hence, this symphony can be seen as a direct product of his shift of compositional strategy and counterpoint study.

Movements

The symphony is written in the traditional four-movement form, and as often in the nineteenth century the Scherzo precedes the Adagio.  All four movements are in C major, except the first part of the slow movement (in C minor); the work is thus homotonal:

A typical performance lasts between 35 and 40 minutes. It is scored for an orchestra consisting of two flutes, two oboes, two clarinets (in B), two bassoons, two French horns (in C), two trumpets (in C), three trombones (alto, tenor, and bass), timpani, and strings.

Performance history
The symphony was first performed on November 5, 1846, at the Gewandhaus in Leipzig with Felix Mendelssohn conducting. It was better received after a second performance some ten days later. The work ultimately came to be admired in the nineteenth century for its "perceived metaphysical content", but the symphony's popularity waned in the twentieth, owing to its unusual structure.

References 

 Seaton, Douglass (2008). "Back from B-A-C-H: Schumann’s Symphony No. 2 in C Major". In Gregory G. Butler, George B. Stauffer, and Mary Dalton Greer. About Bach. University of Illinois Press. .

Further reading

External links 

Program notes from a Richmond Symphony concert
 Program notes from a Filarmonica della Scala concert (it)
Listings of live performances from Bachtrack
Autograph manuscript in composer's hand at The Juilliard Manuscript Collection

2
1846 compositions
Compositions in C major